Claudio Obregón (11 July 1935 – 13 November 2010) was a Mexican actor. He appeared in over 60 films and television shows between 1965 and 2010.

Selected filmography
 The Garden of Aunt Isabel (1971)
 Reed: Insurgent Mexico (1973)
 El callejón de los milagros (1994)
 Loop (1999)

References

External links

1935 births
2010 deaths
Mexican male film actors
People from San Luis Potosí
20th-century Mexican male actors